Cock and Ball Torture (also known as CBT) is a German goregrind band formed on 22 February 1997. The group is known for its groove-heavy riffing and pitchshifted vocals. The band is noted for its pornography-themed imagery and song titles and is one of the more noteworthy acts in the pornogrind subgenre.

Members

Current 
Timo Pahlke – bass, vocals (1997–present)
Sascha Pahlke – drums, vocals (1997–present)
Tobias Augustin – guitar, vocals (1997–present)
Mother Misiunas - daddy, vocals (1997–present)

Past 
Sebastian Denizard – vocals (1998–2002)

Discography

Albums 
 2000: Opus(sy) VI (Shredded Records)
 2002: Sadochismo (Ablated Records)
 2004: Egoleech (Morbid Records)

EPs and split albums 
 1998: Cocktales (Shredded Records)
 1999: Veni, Vidi, Spunky split with Squash Bowels (Bizarre Leprous Productions)
 2000: Zoophilia split with Libido Airbag (Stuhlgang Records)
 2000: Anal Cadaver split with Grossmember (Noweakshit Records)
 2001: Barefoot and Hungry split with Disgorge (Lofty Storm Records)
 2001: Big Tits, Big Dicks split EP with Last Days of Humanity (Unmatched Brutality Records)
 2001: Split with Filth, Negligent Collateral Collapse, and Downthroat (Bizarre Leprous Productions)
 2002: Where Girls Learn to Piss on Command (Stuhlgang Records)

Compilation albums 
 2006: A Cacophonous Collection (Obliteration Records)

References

External links 
 
 Interview with Cock and Ball Torture at Diabolical Conquest Webzine

German grindcore musical groups
Goregrind musical groups
German musical trios
Musical groups established in 1997